Hare Sitting Up is a 1959 mystery thriller novel by the British writer Michael Innes. It is the sixteenth entry in his series featuring John Appleby, a detective with the Metropolitan Police. It is set against the backdrop of the Cold War. The title is taken from a quote from D.H. Lawrence's novel Women in Love. Reference is also made to the 1950 British film Seven Days to Noon.

Synopsis
Professor Howard Juniper, a top British research scientist working on developing a response to biological warfare has vanished and, even more alarmingly may have taken a vial of some deadly disease. Juniper would be a top target for kidnapping from a foreign power, or equally may be suffering from a nervous breakdown. In order to buy time, Appleby persuades his identical twin brother Miles, a schoolmaster, to take his place for a few days.

Appleby's investigations take him to the neglected country estate of a bird-obsessed earl and a top secret rocket base on an island off the northern coast of Scotland. Things are further complicated when the second brother also disappears.

References

Bibliography
 Carter, Ian. Ancient Cultures of Conceit: British University Fiction in the Post-War Years. Routledge, 2019.
 Hubin, Allen J. Crime Fiction, 1749-1980: A Comprehensive Bibliography. Garland Publishing, 1984.
 Reilly, John M. Twentieth Century Crime & Mystery Writers. Springer, 2015.
 Scheper, George L. Michael Innes. Ungar, 1986.

1959 British novels
British mystery novels
British crime novels
British thriller novels
Novels by Michael Innes
Novels set in London
Novels set in Scotland
British detective novels
Victor Gollancz Ltd books